Encher is a village located in Chauth Ka Barwara tehsil of Sawai Madhopur district, Rajasthan, India.

References 

Rajasthan
Sawai Madhopur district